Overton Lane is a historic lane in Oak Hill, Tennessee, U.S.. It was built in the 1840s to separate the plantations owned by John Overton and John M. Lea. The lane was a strategic location in the Battle of Nashville, during the American Civil War. It has been listed on the National Register of Historic Places since July 17, 1980.

References

Buildings and structures on the National Register of Historic Places in Tennessee
Buildings and structures completed in 1845
Buildings and structures in Davidson County, Tennessee
1845 establishments in Tennessee